Kateřina Zechovská (born 4 November 1998) is a Czech ice hockey goaltender and member of the Czech national team, currently playing in the Czech Women's Extraliga with HC Baník Příbram and in the Czech 2. liga with HC Draci Bílina.

Zechovská represented the Czech Republic at the IIHF Women's World Championships in 2019 and 2021. As a junior player with the Czech national under-18 ice hockey team, she participated in the IIHF Women's U18 World Championships in 2014, 2015, and 2016.

References

External links

1998 births
Living people
Ball hockey players
Czech expatriate ice hockey players in Canada
Czech women's ice hockey goaltenders
Ice hockey players at the 2022 Winter Olympics
Olympic ice hockey players of the Czech Republic
People from Teplice
Sportspeople from the Ústí nad Labem Region
Universiade medalists in ice hockey
Medalists at the 2023 Winter World University Games
Universiade bronze medalists for the Czech Republic